"Whole Wide World" is a song written by English rock singer-songwriter Wreckless Eric, who wrote the song in May 1974, and recorded it in 1977, whilst an original member of the Stiff Records label. Additional musicians on the record were Nick Lowe on guitar and bass, and Steve Goulding on drums.

The song was never a chart hit single for Eric, though it subsequently became his best-known recording.  The only charted versions of "Whole Wide World" are a cover by the Australian band Mental As Anything, who took it to No. 53 on the Australian singles chart in 1995, and another by American alternative rock band Cage the Elephant, who took it to No. 11 on the Billboard Alternative Songs chart in 2017.

Sung by Wreckless Eric
1977 on the compilation album A Bunch of Stiff Records
1978 on the self-titled Wreckless Eric album, track 6
1979 on That Summer film soundtrack
1979 on the compilation album The Whole Wide World, track 1
1980 on Big Smash! album, side 3, track 1 (double LP) or CD 2, track 1 (2-CD set)
2001 on Greatest Stiffs album, track 1
2002 on the Me Without You soundtrack, track 14
2006 on Stranger than Fiction soundtrack, track 3
2006 on "Whole Wide World 4 England" single, track 1

Covers by other artists
1977: Elvis Costello and the Attractions on the Stiffs Live Tour. Wreckless Eric later said, "I wasn't a fan of Elvis Costello, particularly."
1978: Italian female pop singer Anna Oxa, on her album Oxanna. Italian translation, titled "Un cielo a metà"
1978: Finnish rock band Eppu Normaali had the song translated to Finnish ("Nuori Poika", meaning Young Boy) as a B-side of their single "Jee Jee"
1987: The Monkees on their Pool It! reunion album
1988: Dogs on their A Million Ways of Killing Time album, and on their live album Fast & Tight (2001)
1991: Die Toten Hosen on Learning English, Lesson One; vocals by Eric Goulden
1995: Mental As Anything on their album Liar Liar Pants on Fire and as a single
1996: The Lightning Seeds as the b-side of their single "Ready or Not".
1998: Laptop on a single
2007: The Proclaimers on the Life with You album
2009: Bahamas on his album Pink Strat
2012: The Crookes covered the song as a b side on their single "Maybe in the Dark"
2014: Meursault on their album The Organ Grinder's Monkey
2015: Pangs on debut single b/w "Already Dead"
2015: Torres for Session Acoustique OÜI FM
2017: Cage the Elephant covered the song for their album Unpeeled
2018: Berhana as a single.
2020: Green Day frontman Billie Joe Armstrong covered the song for Amazon Music's Amazon Original series, then later re-posted the cover to Green Day's YouTube channel as part of his "No Fun Mondays" cover series. Wreckless Eric himself gave his approval of the cover in a statement, referring to Armstrong's rendition as "the most punk rock version ever."

References
Specific references:

General references:

External links
Whole Wide World YouTube

1977 debut singles
1974 songs
1970s ballads
Song recordings produced by Glyn Johns
Rock ballads
British punk rock songs
Die Toten Hosen songs
Elvis Costello songs
The Monkees songs
The Proclaimers songs
Wreckless Eric songs
Mental As Anything songs
Stiff Records singles